Gazi Ershad Ali is a Bangladesh Nationalist Party politician and the former Member of Parliament of Jessore-7.

Career
Ali was elected to parliament from Jessore-7 as a Bangladesh Nationalist Party candidate in 1979.

Death
Ali died on 23 February 2007.

References

Bangladesh Nationalist Party politicians
2007 deaths
2nd Jatiya Sangsad members